The 1933 Tour de France was the 27th edition of the Tour de France, one of cycling's Grand Tours. The Tour began in Paris with a flat stage on 27 June, and Stage 13 occurred on 11 July with a flat stage from Marseille. The race finished in Paris on 23 July.

Stage 13
11 July 1933 – Marseille to Montpellier,

Stage 14
12 July 1933 – Montpellier to Perpignan,

Stage 15
14 July 1933 – Perpignan to Ax-les-Thermes,

Stage 16
15 July 1933 – Ax-les-Thermes to Luchon,

Stage 17
16 July 1933 – Luchon to Tarbes,

Stage 18
17 July 1933 – Tarbes to Pau,

Stage 19
19 July 1933 – Pau to Bordeaux,

Stage 20
20 July 1933 – Bordeaux to La Rochelle,

Stage 21
21 July 1933 – La Rochelle to Rennes,

Stage 22
22 July 1933 – Rennes to Caen,

Stage 23
23 July 1933 – Caen to Paris,

References

1933 Tour de France
Tour de France stages